The Sangrur Municipal Council is a nagar palika (municipal council) which administers the city of Sangrur, Punjab. It has 27 members elected with a first-past-the-post voting system and one ex-officio member which is MLA for Sangrur.

President
The President of Sangrur is the elected chief of the Municipal Council of Sangrur. The president is the first citizen of the city. The president shall be the Chairman of the Standing Committee. Municipal Council elects one of its elected members as the president.

Ex-officio members
Member of legislative assembly from Sangrur represents as the ex-officio member in the council.

Elections

References

Sangrur
Local government in Punjab, India